Jan Liwacz (born 4 October 1898 in Dukla, died 22 April 1980 in Bystrzyca Kłodzka) was a master blacksmith and prisoner of Auschwitz concentration camp best known for the infamous "" slogan over the camp's main entrance gate that he made. When the SS ordered him to make this sign, he placed a hidden message in the word : he turned the letter B upside down.

He was detained and arrested on 16 October 1939 in Bukowsko, and kept in the prisons of Sanok, Krosno, Kraków, and Nowy Wiśnicz; he arrived at Auschwitz in its beginnings, on 20 June 1940, receiving the early camp number of 1010. As a metal worker he was assigned to a kommando manufacturing the camp's infrastructure elements (gratings, handrails, banisters, chandeliers, etc.). During his stay he was twice condemned to solitary confinement in the penal 11th Block in June 1942 and March 1943, spending five weeks there altogether. On 6 December 1944 he was transferred to Mauthausen-Gusen concentration camp, where he was held in the Melk and Ebensee subcamps.

After the liberation of the Ebensee camp on 6 May 1945 he trekked for Poland with Alfons Wrona, his cell-mate from Auschwitz, and settled in Bystrzyca Kłodzka of the western Recovered Territories. Once there, he started working at a local forge owned by Paul Wolf. When the Wolf family was expelled in 1946, he stayed there as an artist blacksmith. Among others, in 1953 he hand forged (free of charge, as his gift to the city) a fence for the Holy Trinity sculpture and so-called "elevation" on Freedom Square in Bystrzyca. After retirement he continued teaching artisan smithery in a local vocational school. He died in 1980 and was buried in Bystrzyca Kłodzka.

In 2008, on 110th anniversary of his birth, there was an exhibition opened in Bystrzyca Kłodzka presenting his life and works.

References

Sources

Bibliography 
 "Jürgen Kaumkötter: "Sztuka w Auschwitz 1940-1945" ("Art in Auschwitz 1940-1945"), Oświęcim, Państwowe Muzeum Auschwitz-Birkenau (Auschwitz-Birkenau State Museum), 2005,

External links 
iron-glass box manufactured by Jan Liwacz (Auschwitz-Birkeanu State Museum collection)

1898 births
1980 deaths
Polish blacksmiths
People from Dukla
Auschwitz concentration camp survivors
Mauthausen concentration camp survivors